Thomas Lopham (died 1416), of Little Carlton, Cambridgeshire, was an English politician.

Family
Lopham was the son and heir of John Lopham of Little Carlton and his wife, Margaret.

Career
He was a Member (MP) of the Parliament of England for Cambridgeshire in November 1414.

References

14th-century births
1416 deaths
English MPs November 1414
People from Cambridgeshire
Serjeants-at-law (England)